Lalaine Vergara-Paras (born June 3, 1987) is an American actress, singer-songwriter, and bassist. She is known for playing Miranda Sanchez in Lizzie McGuire, Abby Ramirez in You Wish!, and Kate in the 1999 remake of Annie.

After appearing in the roles of Young Cosette and Éponine in a Broadway musical production of Les Misérables as a child, Lalaine pursued a career in music. She signed with Warner Bros. Records following the end of Lizzie McGuire and released one studio album and one extended play, both of which saw little commercial success.

Early life 
Lalaine Vergara-Paras was born in Burbank, California, to Filipino parents. She has three older siblings. She spent most of her early years in Burbank and Sherman Oaks, California, then joined the Broadway National Touring cast of Les Misérables as Little Cosette. After the tour Lalaine and her mother resided in Sherman Oaks.

Career

Acting career 

Lalaine is normally credited by her first name only, later stating in 2019 that she didn't use her surname because it sounded too "Hispanic/ethnic". Her acting career began when she was cast in the Broadway production of Les Misérables in the roles of Young Cosette and Eponine. Lalaine made her film debut in 1999 as Theresa in Borderline. Lalaine co-starred with Alicia Morton as Kate in the 1999 remake of Annie (1999 film). Annie aired on The Wonderful World of Disney on November 7, 1999. In 2000, she was cast as Miranda Sanchez on the Disney Channel teen sitcom Lizzie McGuire, alongside Hilary Duff. In early May 2002, she left the show to work on other projects such as the film You Wish!  As a result, Lalaine missed the last 6 episodes produced for the show, which wrapped up filming in late June 2002. Lalaine was also absent in The Lizzie McGuire Movie which filmed about 4–5 months after the show wrapped up filming. At the time of the movie, Lalaine was doing concert tours with Radio Disney, as she is also a musician.

After Lizzie McGuire 

She starred alongside A.J. Trauth and Spencer Breslin in the Disney Channel Original Movie You Wish! which released in 2003 as Abby Ramirez. Lalaine portrayed Chloe, a young Slayer-In-Training who dies by suicide, on the television series Buffy the Vampire Slayer.

In 2009, she appeared in the film Royal Kill along with Eric Roberts and Pat Morita. In 2010, Lalaine also appeared in Easy A starring Emma Stone in a small role as a gossiping girl. In July 2011, Lalaine was featured in a Shane Dawson video titled "Urban Legendz" She was also featured in another one of Shane's videos titled "Hot Chick or Cat Lady?". In 2018, Lalaine starred as Stacy in the film One Night Alone. Lalaine has since starred in two new movies The Man with the Red Balloon as Green Balloon/Balloonless Woman and Definition Please as Krista. Lalaine and former All That star Lori Beth Denberg co-starred in the web series Raymond and Lane. In 2019 Lalaine guest starred on Christy's Kitchen Throwback starring former Even Stevens and Kim Possible star Christy Carlson Romano.

Music career 
In 2003, Lalaine released her only album Inside Story. Lalaine wrote six songs on the album, including "Life Is Good", "Can't Stop", and "Save Myself". She worked with Radio Disney, performing her songs in Southern California, and went to Hawaii with Disney's Imagineers.

In 2005, she performed on the last episode of All That. The following year, she released a single, "I'm Not Your Girl" and remade the song "Cruella DeVil" for the albums DisneyMania 3 and Disneyremixmania. In 1999 she sang on the soundtrack for Annie. In 2004 Lalaine sang "If You Wanna Rock" on the soundtrack for the Disney Channel Original Movie Pixel Perfect.

She played bass guitar in the band Vanity Theft in 2010. In 2011 Lalaine was asked to leave Vanity Theft.

In 2011, Lalaine sang on the song "Different" as part of the "Artists Against Hate".

Legal issues 
In July 2007, Lalaine was arrested and charged with felony possession of methamphetamine. Lalaine pleaded guilty to the felony possession charge. A $50,000 bench warrant was issued for Lalaine after failing to appear at a mandatory court hearing regarding her case. The bench warrant was later recalled by the judge. She completed court mandated drug rehabilitation at a facility in Long Beach, California. The felony possession charge was expunged upon completion of the program, as part of her plea deal.

Filmography

Film

Television

Web series

Discography

Albums 
 2003 - Inside Story

Soundtracks 
 1999 - Annie (1999 film soundtrack)
 2004 - Pixel Perfect
 2005 - Disneymania 3
 2005 - Disneyremixmania

EPs 
 2004 - Haunted EP

Singles 
 2003 - "You Wish"
 2005 - "I'm Not Your Girl"

Other songs 
 "Did You Hear About Us?" – B-side of "I'm Not Your Girl"

Awards and nominations

References

External links 
 
 Lalaine on Instagram

1987 births
Actresses from Burbank, California
20th-century American actresses
21st-century American actresses
American actresses of Filipino descent
American child actresses
American child singers
American people convicted of drug offenses
American women singer-songwriters
American film actresses
American musicians of Filipino descent
American women pop singers
American rock bass guitarists
American rock songwriters
American rock singers
American television actresses
Women bass guitarists
Living people
Singer-songwriters from California
People from Burbank, California
People from Sherman Oaks, Los Angeles
Guitarists from California
21st-century American singers
21st-century American women singers
21st-century American bass guitarists
Warner Records artists